The following highways are numbered 575:

Canada

United States